Walter Edwin Hitchcock (1872 – June 23, 1917) was an American actor. He appeared on stage, in silent films, and had several leading roles.

Career 
Hitchcock was born in 1872 in Malden, Massachusetts or New Castle, Maine. In his youth, Hitchcock acted in amateur theatricals.

He eventually moved on to becoming an actor in many silent films. Variety called his performance in The Idler (1915) "very good, indeed". He was known for his role in The Auction Block (1917).

In 1916, his maid discovered some fake money in his hotel room that he had taken from the set of The House of Tears (1915). It was reported to federal agents, who investigated and "enjoyed a good laugh".

Hitchcock died on June 23, 1917, at Hotel Somerset in New York City of heart failure.

Personal life 
He married fellow actress Donna Barrell, also known as Teresa Michelene. Michelene was with him at the time of his death.

Filmography
Uncle Tom's Cabin (1914), as George Shelby
The Walls of Jericho (1914)
Life's Shop Window (1914), as Eustace Pelham
Destiny: Or, The Soul of a Woman (1915) as The Connoisseur
The House of Tears (1915), as Henry Thorne
The Climbers (1915), as Dick Sterling
The Celebrated Scandal (1915), as Don Severo 
The Snowbird (1916), as Michael Flynn
The Libertine (1916) as Charlie Grigg
The White Raven (1917), as John Blaisdell
Vera, the Medium (1917), as Herbert Carlton
The Auction Block (1917)
The Belle of the Season (1919), as Clifton Brophy

References

External links 

 
 
 Walter Hitchcock grave
 Norwich Bulletin April 3, 1917..Walter Hitchcock and Anna Q. Nilsson in The Moral Code
kinotv Walter Hitchcock

1872 births
1917 deaths